Berthyfedwen is a small village in the  community of Llandyfriog, Ceredigion, Wales, which is 65.8 miles (105.9 km) from Cardiff and 187.1 miles (301 km) from London. Berthyfedwen is represented in the Senedd by Elin Jones (Plaid Cymru) and is part of the Ceredigion constituency in the House of Commons.

References

See also
List of localities in Wales by population

Villages in Ceredigion